Fidel González (born 24 April 1899, date of death unknown) was a Spanish épée and sabre fencer. He competed in three events at the 1928 Summer Olympics.

References

External links
 

1899 births
Year of death missing
Spanish male épée fencers
Olympic fencers of Spain
Fencers at the 1928 Summer Olympics
Spanish male sabre fencers